Lake Nettie National Wildlife Refuge is a  National Wildlife Refuge (NWR) in the U.S. state of North Dakota.  of the refuge are public while the remaining  is an easement on privately owned land, but the landowners and U.S. Government work cooperatively to protect the resources. The U.S. Fish and Wildlife Service oversees Lake Nettie NWR from offices at Audubon National Wildlife Refuge.

References

External links
 Oh Ranger: Lake Nettie National Wildlife Refuge

Protected areas of McLean County, North Dakota
National Wildlife Refuges in North Dakota
Easement refuges in North Dakota